Avant. The Journal of the Philosophical-Interdisciplinary Vanguard (Trends in interdisciplinary studies and philosophy of science) is a triannual peer-reviewed open access academic journal. It is published by the Centre of Philosophical Research in Warsaw and cooperates with the faculty and PhD students at the NCU. The editor-in-chief is Witold Wachowski.

The journal is bilingual (English and Polish), published both online and in print.

The Avant journal is interested in current trends in interdisciplinary studies and philosophy of science. The journal publishes reviews and review papers, polemical texts, comments, opinions, academic essays and interviews; it focuses on new approaches in cognitive science, phenomenology, psychology, sociology, anthropology, studies on art, social ontology, constructivism, robotics, sciences of complexity and others.

References

English-language journals
Philosophy of science journals
Polish-language journals
Publications established in 2010
Triannual journals
Philosophy of mind journals
Social philosophy journals
Academic journals published in Poland